A silanide is a chemical compound containing an anionic silicon(IV) centre, the parent ion being . The hydrogen atoms can also be substituted to produced more complex derivative anions such as tris(trimethylsilyl)silanide (hypersilyl), tris(tert-butyl)silanide, tris(pentafluoroethyl)silanide, or triphenylsilanide. The simple silanide ion can also be called trihydridosilanide or silyl hydride.

Formation
The triphenylsilanide can be made in a reaction of Ph3SiSiMe3 with the metal tert-butoxy compound.

Reacting hydrogen with potassium triphenylsilyl  can yield potassium silanide.

Other method to form silanides are to heat a heavy metal silicide with hydrogen, or react the dissolved metal with silane.

Atomic metals can react directly with silane to yield unstable molecules with  formulae. These can be condensed into a noble gas matrix. With titanium this also yields molecules with hydrogen bridging between silicon and titanium.

Properties 
The silanide ion has an effective ionic radius of 2.26 Å. In salts at room temperature the ion's orientation is not stable, and it rotates. But at lower temperatures (under 200K) silanide becomes fixed in orientation. The ordered structure forms the β- phase, whereas the higher temperature and more symmetrical disordered structure is called α- phase. The β- phase is about 15% more compact than the α-phase.

The silanide ion has C3v symmetry. The silicon to hydrogen bond length is 1.52 Å and the H-Si-H bond angle is 92.2°, not far off a right angle. In a range of compounds, the stretching force constant for the Si-H bond is 1.9 to 2.05 N cm–1, which is much softer than that of silane's 2.77 N cm–1.

Silanide salts are very easily damaged by air or water.

Heating to under 414K results in the release of hydrogen and the formation of a Zintl-phase MSi. If an alkali silande is rapidly heated to 500K another irreversible reaction occurs:

.

Use
Trihydridosilanides have been investigated as hydrogen storage materials. Potassium silanide can reversibly gain or lose hydrogen over several hours at 373K. However this does not work for sodium silanide. The rate of hydrogen exchange may be improved by a catalyst. Unwanted reactions may reduce the number of times this process can happen.

List

Related 

More complex derivatives include silanimine -,

With a double bond between silicon and the metal  a silylene complex is formed. With a triple bond, M≡SiH forms with metals such as molybdenum and tungsten.

With less hydrogen, a polyanionic hydride [(SiH)−] can be formed.

References

Silanes
Anions